"Death by Rock and Roll" is a song recorded by American rock band The Pretty Reckless, released as the lead single from their fourth studio album of the same name. "Death by Rock and Roll" was released to digital retailers on May 15, 2020, and to active rock radio on June 9, 2020, as the album's lead single. It is the band's first single for Fearless Records.

Background
"Death by Rock and Roll" was written by band members Taylor Momsen and Ben Phillips. The song serves as a tribute to late producer Kato Khandwala, who worked on the group's first three albums. The song was produced by Jonathan Wyman, making it their first song to be produced by a different producer.

Commercial performance
In July 2020, "Death by Rock and Roll" became The Pretty Reckless's fifth number-one single on the Billboard's Mainstream Rock chart, setting a new record for female-fronted rock groups. The song remained atop the chart for three consecutive weeks. The song also topped Billboard's Canada Rock, marking their first number one on the chart.

Music video
The Pretty Reckless released an animated lyric video for "Death by Rock and Roll" on June 18, 2020, featuring art direction from Lucas David.

Charts

Weekly charts

Year-end charts

Release history

References

2020 singles
2020 songs
Fearless Records singles
The Pretty Reckless songs
Songs written by Taylor Momsen